Michael David Adamle (born October 4, 1949) is a former American football player and sports broadcaster.

Adamle was a sports anchor at other Chicago television stations, including WLS-TV from 1982 to 1989 before hosting American Gladiators, a first stint at WMAQ-TV from 1998 to 2001, and then at WBBM-TV from 2001 to 2004 before returning to Channel 5 until 2017, when he was diagnosed with CTE-induced dementia which eventually forced his retirement. For much of 2008, Adamle worked for World Wrestling Entertainment (WWE) in a variety of roles, including interviewer, play-by-play commentator, and General Manager of Raw.

Early life
Born in Moline, Illinois, Adamle grew up in Kent, Ohio and graduated from Theodore Roosevelt High School in 1967. His father, Tony Adamle, also found some success with the Cleveland Browns in the 1940s and 1950s, then became a physician.

College football
Adamle played college football at Northwestern University in the Big Ten Conference. He was a team captain, an All-American fullback, and the Big Ten MVP in 1970. Adamle's 316 rushing yards against Wisconsin in 1969 set the school record (by 98 yards) which still stands. He also set the record for kick return yards in a year, and graduated in 1971.

NFL career
Adamle played six years in the National Football League, two seasons each with three teams. He was a fifth round pick (120th overall) of the Kansas City Chiefs in the 1971 NFL Draft and later played for the New York Jets and Chicago Bears.  His playing career ended when the Bears waived him prior to the 1977 season to make room on the roster for wide receiver John Gilliam.

Post NFL career

Football announcing
After retiring from playing football professionally, Adamle joined NBC Sports, where he was both a studio host and sideline reporter for various events. He spent six years with NBC Sports, hosting SportsWorld and pre-game shows. He was also the host of GrandStand, which was both a pregame show for the National Football League (NFL) and a sports anthology series during the NFL's off-season. In 1984, he was ABC's sideline reporter for the United States Football League. In 2001, Adamle returned to sideline reporting when he joined KNBC's Fred Roggin on NBC's primary XFL broadcast team.

American Gladiators
He was also the co-host of American Gladiators from 1989 to 1996. In addition, he was a contender in a celebrity contenders show towards the end of the show's run. Adamle also co-hosted International Gladiators with the UK and Australian Hosts and commentated in one series alongside UK commentator John Sachs. He appeared on the fourth-season premiere of Family Matters playing himself in a fictional episode of American Gladiators. After American Gladiators ended, he became a reporter for ESPN.

Other announcing
He has also covered the 1988 Winter Olympics and the 2000 and 2004 Summer Olympics. In the summer of 2005, Adamle was the host of another NBC property, Bravo's Battle of the Network Reality Stars. In July 2006, Adamle became a color commentator for the Professional Bull Riders (PBR)'s Built Ford Tough Series (another event which NBC has split rights).

World Wrestling Entertainment (2008)
On January 27, 2008, at the Royal Rumble, Adamle began working as an interviewer for World Wrestling Entertainment (WWE). He then worked on WWE Raw as an interviewer, often making mistakes with each onscreen appearance. During his debut, he mistakenly referred to Jeff Hardy as "Jeff Harvey". He later became ECWs play-by-play announcer on April 15, replacing Joey Styles. Adamle continued to make frequent mistakes during his commentary duties on ECW, with former ECW owner and booker Paul Heyman and former talent Lance Storm criticizing Adamle for them. On April 29, Adamle left a broadcast of ECW before the main event match, and his partner Tazz was asked to do the same. This was worked into a storyline as WWE reported that Adamle and Tazz may have left due to fan criticism of Adamle's commentary. The following week, he cut a promo apologizing for his actions.

On the July 28 episode of Raw, Executive Vice President Shane McMahon announced that Adamle was the new General Manager for the Raw brand. During his tenure as general manager, he promoted a variety of high-profile matches that he dubbed as "Adamle Originals." On the October 27 episode of Raw, as part of his storyline, he slapped Randy Orton after Orton insulted him personally. The following week on Raw, during an in-ring segment with Shane McMahon and Orton, Adamle resigned from his position as general manager.

Arena Football League
Adamle was the play-by-play announcer for the Chicago Rush of the Arena Football League and broadcast Rush games for Comcast SportsNet Chicago and WGN. Following the 2013 AFL season, the Rush were unable to commit to the 2014 and 2015 AFL seasons and the team's operation were suspended immediately and the active roster was allocated amongst the rest of the AFL.

Personal life
Adamle and his wife Kim have four children - Brad, Courtney, Alexandra, and Svetlana (adopted as a teenager from Ukraine), and three grandchildren. He lives in Elgin, Illinois.

Adamle has epilepsy. After work with Epilepsy Foundation, where he is currently a member of the Greater Chicago division's board of directors, Adamle was given his Personal Achievement Award at the 2007 Richard N. Rovner Awards Dinner. Adamle has completed two Ironman Triathlons in Kona, most recently as a 60-year-old in 2009, where he completed the race in 14 hours, 7 minutes and 39 seconds.  He has also completed other Ironman races like Ironman USA (Lake Placid) 2003.

On February 7, 2017, Adamle said he was diagnosed with dementia, and that his doctor saw signs of chronic traumatic encephalopathy. He believes this and the past 19 years of epileptic seizures resulted from his concussions in football. He officially retired from WMAQ-TV on March 24, 2017, at a send-off party with colleagues.

Championships and accomplishmentsWrestling Observer Newsletter awards'
Worst Television Announcer (2008)

See also
 List of NCAA major college yearly punt and kickoff return leaders

References

External links
 
 

1949 births
American color commentators
American football running backs
American game show hosts
American male journalists
American people of Slovenian descent
American radio reporters and correspondents
American radio sports announcers
American television reporters and correspondents
ArenaBowl broadcasters
Arena football announcers
Chicago Bears players
College football announcers
Kansas City Chiefs players
Living people
National Football League announcers
New York Jets players
Northwestern Wildcats football players
Olympic Games broadcasters
People from Euclid, Ohio
People with epilepsy
People with traumatic brain injuries
Players of American football from Ohio
Professional wrestling announcers
Professional wrestling authority figures
Television sports anchors from Chicago
United States Football League announcers
XFL (2001) announcers